S-TEC or M-TEC is a low-displacement engine range co-developed by Suzuki and Daewoo Motors for use in micro and subcompact cars.

S-TEC
The first model was  SOHC straight-three engine based on the powerplant of the Suzuki Alto.

A new engine plant for the updated model T4 was built. The 1.0 version is used in Chevrolet Matiz and the 1.2 in the European Chevrolet Kalos.

In 2004 the 0.8 and 1.0 engines were updated again. New intake and exhaust systems, along with low-friction aluminum cam followers with rollers were added, resulting in better economy.

Applications:
1991-2001 Daewoo Tico/Fino
1998–present Chevrolet/Daewoo Matiz
Chevrolet/Daewoo Kalos

S-TEC II
For 2008, a new  version dubbed S-TEC II is introduced with the new Chevrolet Aveo hatchback; new features include chain-driven 16-valve DOHC valvetrain and variable intake geometry. The 1.0 L version has been introduced with the 2010 Chevrolet Spark. A 1.2 L LPG/gasoline version was developed exclusively for the India market; called SMARTECH II and used in the 2010 Chevrolet Beat. Introduced in 2013, the 1.2 L version is available in the United States version of the Chevrolet Spark.

Applications:
 2008-2011 Chevrolet Aveo
 2010–present Chevrolet Sail
 2010–present Chevrolet Beat/Spark
 2018–present Wuling Formo
 2002-2012 Micro Privliege

S-TEC III

1.4 L applications:

 Chevrolet Sail (second generation)

 Chevrolet Sail (third generation)
 2013-2015 Chevrolet Spin
 Baojun 630
 2013–2016 Chevrolet Lacetti/Buick Excelle (first generation)
 2016–present Buick Excelle (second generation)
 Wuling Rongguang
 Wuling Hongguang V (later Rongguang V)
 Wuling Hongguang
 Wuling Hongguang S
 Wuling Hongguang S1/Confero S/Formo
 Wuling Zhengcheng
 Wuling Victory
 Buick Verano (second generation, China)
 Baojun 310/310W
 Baojun 330
 Baojun 610/630
 Baojun 730/Wuling Cortez CT
 Baojun 510
 Baojun 530/Wuling Almaz/Chevrolet Captiva/MG Hector
 Chevrolet Lova RV
 2017–present Chevrolet Cavalier
 2014–2020 Chevrolet Cruze Classic (China)
 2014–2020 Chevrolet Cruze (China)
 2021–present Buick Velite 6 PHEV

NOTE: Some horsepower and torque number have small differences on different models.

See also
 GM Family 1 engine (called E-TEC by Daewoo)
 GM Small Gasoline Engine
 GM Family 0 engine

References

Daewoo engines
Suzuki engines
Straight-three engines
Straight-four engines
Gasoline engines by model